Anacithara leptalea is a species of sea snail, a marine gastropod mollusk in the family Horaiclavidae.

Description
The length of the shell attains 3.5 mm, its diameter 1.5 mm.

(Original description) The small, solid shell is narrowly ovate. Its colour is uniform white. It contains six whorls, including a smooth two-whorled protoconch. Prominent ribs, parted by their own breadth, are set at nine or ten to a whorl.;Both ribs and interstices are traversed by a series of uniform sharp spiral threads—six on the penultimate whorl and thirteen on the body whorl. The aperture is narrow, protected by a broad and high varix. The siphonal canal is short and open. The sinus is a semicircular notch. There are no denticules on the lips, but a deeply seated fold is just visible on the columella.

Distribution
This marine species is endemic to Australia and occurs off Queensland.

References

External links
  Tucker, J.K. 2004 Catalog of recent and fossil turrids (Mollusca: Gastropoda). Zootaxa 682:1–1295.

leptalea
Gastropods of Australia
Gastropods described in 1922